Frontier justice is extrajudicial punishment that is motivated by the nonexistence of law and order or dissatisfaction with justice. The phrase can also be used to describe a prejudiced judge. Lynching, vigilantism and gunfighting are considered forms of frontier justice.

Examples

United States 
 March 20 to April 15, 1882: Wyatt Earp and Doc Holliday tracked and killed 4 cowboys said to be responsible for Morgan Earp's death, which would later become known as the Earp Vendetta Ride.
 Late 1800s: A group of self-appointed lawmen called "stranglers" lynched around sixty horse rustlers and cattle rustlers along southwest North Dakota's Little Missouri River.

Brazil 
 April 1991: José Vicente Anunciação murdered a co-worker during a drunken knife-fight in Salvador, Bahia. Witnesses to the crime were not able to provide evidence in court. Anunciação was set free and then dragged from his bed at night by a mob of forty people who beat him to death with bricks and clubs. Previously, a mob of 1,500 people stormed and set fire to the Paraná prison where Valdecir Ferreira and Altair Gomes were being held for the murder of a taxi-cab driver.

India 
 “At 3pm on August 13 2004, Akku Yadav was lynched by a mob of around 200 women from Kasturba Nagar. It took them 15 minutes to hack to death the man they say raped them with impunity for more than a decade. Chilli powder was thrown in his face and stones hurled. As he flailed and fought, one of his alleged victims hacked off his penis with a vegetable knife. A further 70 stab wounds were left on his body. The incident was made all the more extraordinary by its setting. Yadav was murdered not in the dark alleys of the slum, but on the shiny white marble floor of Nagpur district court.” https://www.theguardian.com/world/2005/sep/16/india.gender

See also 
Citizen's arrest
Feud
Gjakmarrja
Jungle law
List of feuds in the United States
Noble cause corruption
Ochlocracy
Range war
Rough music
Vigilante
Hanging of Patrick O'Connor
Witch-hunt

References 

Capital punishment
Criminal law
Human rights abuses
Extrajudicial killings
Vigilantism
Vigilantism in the United States